The Mausoleum of Amir Khamza Khasti Podshoh is located in the Sughd province of northern Tajikistan.

Site Description 
Built on the grave of a saint, the mausoleum is a unique testament to Islamic Central Asian architecture. The Middle Ages period structure includes intricately carved ceilings, Koranic inscriptions, and mud-brick construction.

World Heritage Status 
This site was added to the UNESCO World Heritage Tentative List on November 9, 1999, in the Cultural category.

Notes

References 
Mausoleum of "Amir Khamza Khasti Podshoh" - UNESCO World Heritage Centre Retrieved 2009-03-04.

Tajikistani culture
Historic sites in Tajikistan
Mausoleums in Tajikistan